The following is a list of Jewish rock bands and artists, bands which have Jewish themes in their music.


List

References 

 
Jewish
Rock bands